Ulmus laevis var. parvifolia is a mutant variety of European white elm found exclusively on the island of Ada Ciganlija, in the Sava at Belgrade, Serbia.

Description
The tree is small and has a dense crown. The leaves are much smaller than those of the species, 21 – 59 mm (average 40 mm) in length by 14 – 36 mm (average 26 mm) width, and chartreuse in colour. The specimen of var. parvifolia on Ada Ciganlija is very slow-growing, attaining a height of only 5.5 m in almost 60 years, with a d.b.h. of just 13 cm.

Pests and diseases
Not known, but the species has a field resistance to Dutch elm disease, through the presence of a triterpene, Alnulin, in the bark which acts as an antifeedant to the vector Scolytus beetles.

Cultivation
The tree is not known to have ever flowered, thus propagation is by cuttings only. The variety is not known to be in commerce in Serbia or elsewhere.

References

Elm species and varieties
Trees of Europe
Flora of Serbia
Ulmus articles missing images
laevis var. parvifolia